Daniela Lizbeth Solís Contreras (born 19 April 1993) is an American-raised Mexican footballer who plays as a forward for Liga MX Femenil club CF Monterrey. She has been a member of the Mexico women's national team.

International career
Solís represented Mexico at the 2010 FIFA U-17 Women's World Cup, the 2012 CONCACAF Women's U-20 Championship and the 2012 FIFA U-20 Women's World Cup. At senior level, she played the 2013 Summer Universiade.

International goals
Scores and results list Mexico's goal tally first

References

External links
 
 

1993 births
Living people
Women's association football forwards
Mexican women's footballers
Footballers from Guadalajara, Jalisco
Mexico women's international footballers
Universiade silver medalists for Mexico
Universiade medalists in football
Liga MX Femenil players
C.F. Monterrey (women) players
Mexican emigrants to the United States
People with acquired American citizenship
American women's soccer players
Soccer players from Oregon
People from Sherwood, Oregon
American sportspeople of Mexican descent
Portland State Vikings women's soccer players
Medalists at the 2013 Summer Universiade
Mexican footballers